Anthony William "Tony" Marx (born February 28, 1959) is an American academic. He became the current president and CEO of the New York Public Library in July 2011, succeeding Paul LeClerc.  Marx is the former president of Amherst College, in Amherst, Massachusetts. Since joining the New York Public Library, Marx has focused on expanding the library’s education programs and on increasing public access to library e-books. He has also prioritized services for researchers and bringing library materials to public schools.

Biography
Marx is an alumnus of the Bronx High School of Science after which he attended Wesleyan University before transferring to Yale University, where, in 1981, he received a B.S. magna cum laude. He received an M.P.A. from the Woodrow Wilson School of Public and International Affairs at Princeton University in 1986, followed by M.A. and Ph.D. degrees in politics from Princeton in 1987 and 1990. Marx completed a doctoral dissertation titled "Lessons of struggle: South African internal opposition movements, 1960-1990." In 2012, one year after he left the college, he received an honorary degree from Amherst College.

After graduating from Yale, Marx spent a year in South Africa participating in the anti-Apartheid movement. Even after returning to the U.S. for graduate school at Princeton, he returned frequently to participate in the founding of Khanya College, a post-secondary college which prepared black students for university.

According to BusinessWeek, one reason the Amherst Board of Trustees chose Marx as president was his support for socioeconomic diversity on college campuses.  One of Marx's goals was to make Amherst more accessible to qualified students from lower income families. Marx supports the 'QuestBridge College Match' program at Amherst, an alternative college admission and financial aid process.

Published works 
Marx has written three books on nation-building, concentrating on South Africa.

 Lessons of Struggle: South African Internal Opposition, 1960–1990 (1992)
 Making Race and Nation: A Comparison of South Africa, the United States, and Brazil (1998)
 Faith in Nation: Exclusionary Origins of Nationalism (2005)

See also 
John William Ward (professor)

Notes

External links
Anthony Marx bio on Amherst web site
Article about Marx in BusinessWeek
QuestBridge website-College Match
Colleges Face Challenges of the Class Divide: NPR
Interview on Charlie Rose Show PBS (After 21 minutes)

1959 births
20th-century American Jews
Living people
The Bronx High School of Science alumni
Wesleyan University alumni
Yale University alumni
Princeton School of Public and International Affairs alumni
Columbia University faculty
Fellows of the American Academy of Arts and Sciences
Presidents of Amherst College
Presidents of the New York Public Library
21st-century American Jews